Joseph Zhu Huayu (1918 - 26 February 2005) was a Chinese priest, bishop of the Catholic Patriotic Association, recognized by the state authorities of the People's Republic of China, while remaining without communication with the Vatican.

Biography
Zhu was born in Xingtai, Hebei, in 1918. He was ordained in 1947. He worked as a priest. The years 1966-1976 (Cultural Revolution) he forced to work in the fields instead of spreading Catholicism. From 1981, he worked as a pastor in the province of Anhui. In 1986 he became the bishop of Bengbu. After the administrative changes of the diocese (made by the state authorities), he headed the new diocese of Anhui (2001), covering the entire province, and the merger of the existing dioceses of Bengbu, Anqing and Wuhu and the Tunxi Apostolic Prefecture.

References

1918 births
People from Xingtai
2005 deaths
21st-century Roman Catholic bishops in China
20th-century Roman Catholic bishops in China
Bishops of the Catholic Patriotic Association